Visvesvaraya Technological University (VTU), previously spelled Visveswaraiah Technological University, is a collegiate public state university in Belagavi, Karnataka established by the Government of Karnataka. All colleges in the State of Karnataka imparting education in Engineering or Technology, except those that have the consent of VTU and sanction of the Government, are required to be affiliated with Visvesvaraya Technological University, Belagavi. The university is named after Sir M. Visvesvaraya, an Indian civil engineer, statesman and the 19th Diwan of Mysore.
VTU is one of the largest technical university which provide opportunities for engineering students and management students.

History

Visvesvaraya Technological University (VTU) was established by the Government of Karnataka on 1 April 1998 with its headquarters at Belagavi, as per the provisions of the Visvesvaraya Technological University Act, 1994, an Act to establish and incorporate a university in the State of Karnataka for the development of engineering, technology and allied sciences. For effective administration, four regional offices at the four revenue divisional headquarters, namely, Belagavi, Bangalore, Mysore and Gulbarga were established. VTU was established by the Government in order to promote planned and sustainable development of technical education consistent with state and national policies and bringing various colleges affiliated earlier to different universities, with different syllabi, different procedures and different traditions under one umbrella.

Campus
As per the provisions of the VTU Act 1994, the headquarters of the university is at Belagavi, Karnataka. The VTU headquarters is named “Jnana Sangama”. Additionally, the university has three regional centres in Bangalore, Kalaburagi and Mysore. 
Visvesvaraya Institute of Advanced Technology, also known as VIAT, is a research institute being constructed near Muddenahalli, Karnataka. 

The university also has 13 Quality Improvement Programme (QIP) centers in various affiliated colleges and 16 extension centers for offering postgraduate programs. It has around 2,305 departments recognised as research centres which are spread across its affiliated institutions in Karnataka. The Jnana Sangama, Belagavi campus and the regional and extension centres of VTU at Bangalore, Davangere, Gulbarga and Mysore offer M.Tech, MBA, MCA and PhD programs.

Academics

Academic programmes 

VTU offers undergraduate engineering programs that award a Bachelor of Engineering (BE) or Bachelor of Technology (B.Tech.) degree. The university offers postgraduate programs that lead to Master of Technology (M.Tech.),Master of Architecture (M.Arch) Master of Science (MSc) by research, Master of Business Administration (MBA), Master of Computer Applications (MCA) and doctorate (PhD). The MSc and PhD are research degrees while the rest are taught degrees.

Undergraduate courses

The university has 12 undergraduate boards which offer Bachelor of Engineering (B.E.) programs and one undergraduate board which offers Bachelor of Architecture (BArch) course:

‡ The Architecture board offers the BArch course.

Postgraduate courses

The university has 11 postgraduate boards which offer Master of Technology (M.Tech.) programs:

Scheme and syllabus

Visvesvaraya Technological University accomplished its primary task of setting a common syllabus across the state in 1998. The university regularly revises the syllabus keeping in view technology upgrades around the world. The syllabus has been updated in 2002, 2006, 2010, 2014, 2015, 2017, 2018 and 2021.  VTU adopted a Choice Based Credit System (CBCS) for students admitted to the university from the academic year 2015–2016. The CBCS provides a choice for students to select from the prescribed courses (i.e. core, elective, foundation and mandatory non-credit courses). As part of the new CBCS scheme, VTU also moved to a Cumulative Grade Point Average (CGPA) grading system from the previous system of awarding percentage and class to students. 
VTU has also made an internship of eight weeks mandatory for undergraduate and postgraduate engineering students in affiliated colleges.

Grading

For students matriculating since the academic year 2015–2016, VTU adopts an absolute grading system wherein the marks are converted to grades, and every semester results are declared with a semester grade point average (SGPA) and a Cumulative Grade Point Average (CGPA). To obtain a degree, in addition to clearing all the subjects, a student must also obtain a minimum CGPA of five (5.0).

Prior to the introduction of the Choice Based Credit System, students were awarded a percentage and a class, as defined:
First class with distinction (FCD): Not less than 70% of the aggregate marks in first attempt
First class (FC): Less than 70% but not less than 60% of the aggregate marks in first attempt
Second class (SC): Less than 60% of the aggregate marks in first attempt

Collaborations
The university has signed MoUs with multinational corporations like IBM, Intel Asia Electronics Inc., Ingersoll-Rand (India) Ltd., Bangalore, Nokia, Bosch Rexroth and Microsoft to improve the industry interactions for students and teachers.

VTU is also a member of Association of Indian Universities and Association of Commonwealth Universities.

Organisation and administration

Governance
VTU is administered by its Executive Council and Academic Senate whose members are selected from the academic community and government officials. The present chancellor is Sri Thawar Chand Gehlot, Governor of Karnataka state and the vice-chancellor is Dr. S. Vidyashankar.

Affiliated colleges 

As of 2021, there are 219 colleges affiliated to the university (107 under Bangalore region, 34 under Belagavi region, 18 under Gulbarga region and 60 under Mysore region). The colleges are categorised as 'government', 'private-aided' and 'private-unaided' based on the type of funding. A few colleges may be classified as 'minority linguistic' and 'minority religious' based on the minority status of languages and religions. Further, these colleges are placed under 'autonomous' and 'non-autonomous' category of institutions granted by UGC. There are 25 autonomous colleges affiliated to VTU.

See List of colleges affiliated to Visvesvaraya Technological University

Examinations
Exams are conducted twice a year for all affiliated non-autonomous colleges. Odd semester exam is conducted during December and January. Results usually published in February. Even semester exams are conducted during May/June; results are published in July.

Centres of excellence 

The university has signed MoUs with international organisations (such as CANEUS International) and multinational corporations (like IBM, Intel Asia Electronics Inc., Ingersoll-Rand (India) Ltd., Bangalore, Nokia, Bosch Rexroth and Microsoft) and has set up centres of excellence.

Visvesvaraya Institute of Advanced Technology

Visvesvaraya Institute of Advanced Technology (VIAT) is a research institute being constructed in Muddenahalli, Karnataka. In the initial years, VIAT will focus on research in embedded technology, software quality, agricultural engineering and bioengineering. Each department will function as a 'discovery-innovation centre.' The institute will offer graduate and PhD programs in the sciences.

Student life

VTU Fest

The university annually organises an inter-collegiate culfest which sees participants from all its affiliated colleges.

Vice-Chancellors

See also

 List of colleges affiliated to Visvesvaraya Technological University
 Visvesvaraya Institute of Advanced Technology

References

External links

Official website  (English)

Universities in Karnataka
 
1998 establishments in Karnataka
Educational institutions established in 1998